Miran is a town and union council in Dera Ismail Khan District of Khyber-Pakhtunkhwa. It is located at 31°23'60N 70°43'0E and has an altitude of 148 metres (488 feet).

References

Union councils of Dera Ismail Khan District
Populated places in Dera Ismail Khan District